During the 1952–53 English football season, Arsenal F.C. competed in the Football League First Division.

Season summary
After finishing third the previous term, Arsenal battled with Preston North End in the 1952/53 season for the title, and ultimately finished level on points; however, Arsenal won the league for the seventh time on goal average, by a margin of 0.099. With Preston having won their final game of the season two days before Arsenal faced Burnley in their final match, it meant Arsenal needed to win to claim the title. Goals from Alex Forbes, Jimmy Logie and Doug Lishman ensured a 3–2 win.

In the FA Cup, Arsenal beat Doncaster Rovers, Bury and Burnley before being knocked out by eventual winners Blackpool in the quarter-finals. The Gunners' biggest win was joint between the cup win over Bury and a league fixture against Derby County; both were won 6–2. Their highest scoring match was a 6–4 triumph at Reading, and their top scorer Doug Lishman, who scored 25 goals in all competitions.

Final league table

Results
Arsenal's score comes first

Football League First Division

FA Cup

References

Arsenal F.C. seasons
Arsenal
English football championship-winning seasons